Rosstroy (sometimes Rosstroi) was the governmental agency for construction and residential and utilities services in Russia. It was the successor of Gosstroy, a Soviet agency.

The full name of the authority is Federal agency of construction, housing and housing services of the Russian Federation.

The agency was abolished by D.A. Medvedev's Decree (Ukase) N 724 of 12 May 2008.

Since 2013, its responsibilities are in the hands of Ministry of Construction Industry, Housing and Utilities Sector.

External links
Rosstroy website

Defunct government agencies of Russia